The Keystone Hotel is a historic hotel building in McCook, Nebraska. It was built as a hotel in 1922, and it was remodelled as a retirement facility in 1970. It was designed in the Renaissance Revival style by Archer and Gloyd, an architectural firm based in Kansas City, Missouri. It has been listed on the National Register of Historic Places since July 5, 2001.

References

National Register of Historic Places in Red Willow County, Nebraska
Renaissance Revival architecture in Nebraska
Hotel buildings completed in 1922